Catenay is a commune situated upon the Seine-Maritime department which are in the Normandy region in northern France.

Geography

Population

Places of interest
 The church of St.Clair, dating from the nineteenth century.
 Château de Montlambert.

See also
Communes of the Seine-Maritime department

References

Communes of Seine-Maritime